Hana Mandlíková defeated Sylvia Hanika in the final, 6–2, 6–4 to win the women's singles tennis title at the 1981 French Open.

Chris Evert was the two-time defending champion, but lost in the semifinals to Mandlíková.

Seeds
The seeded players are listed below. Hana Mandlíková is the champion; others show the round in which they were eliminated.

  Chris Evert (semifinals)
  Martina Navratilova (quarterfinals)
  Andrea Jaeger (semifinals)
  Hana Mandlíková (champion)
  Virginia Ruzici (quarterfinals)
  Sylvia Hanika (finalist)
  Mima Jaušovec (quarterfinals)
  Dianne Fromholtz (third round)
  Kathy Jordan (third round)
  Bettina Bunge (fourth round)
  Anne Smith (fourth round)
  Regina Maršíková (fourth round)
  Wendy White (second round)
  Ivanna Madruga (third round)
  Leslie Allen (fourth round)
  Virginia Wade (fourth round)

Draw

Key
 Q = Qualifier
 WC = Wild card
 LL = Lucky loser
 r = Retired

Finals

Earlier rounds

Section 1

Section 2

Section 3

Section 4

Section 5

Section 6

Section 7

Section 8

References

External links
1981 French Open – Women's draws and results at the International Tennis Federation

Women's Singles
French Open by year – Women's singles
French Open - Women's Singles
1981 in women's tennis
1981 in French women's sport